The 1967 Bucknell Bison football team was an American football team that represented Bucknell University during the 1967 NCAA College Division football season. Bucknell placed third in the Middle Atlantic Conference, University Division.

In their third year under head coach Carroll Huntress, the Bison compiled a 4–6 record. Dick Kaufmann was the team captain.

With a 3–2 record against MAC University Division opponents, the Bison narrowly missed second place in the division, finishing half a game behind Hofstra.

Bucknell played its home games at Memorial Stadium on the university campus in Lewisburg, Pennsylvania.

Schedule

References

Bucknell
Bucknell Bison football seasons
Bucknell Bison football